Edward Augustus Dunlap Jr. (September 25, 1879 – June 10, 1964) was an American football, baseball, and track and field coach. He served as the head football coach at the University of Richmond from 1905 until 1909 and again in 1912, compiling a record of 19–33–5. While at Richmond, he was also the baseball coach as well as the school's athletic director.

Dunlap was born in Brunswick, Maine and graduated from Bowdoin College in 1903. After leaving Richmond, he was an inspector for the United Shoe Machinery Corporation. Dunlap resided in Beverly, Georgetown, and Haverhill, Massachusetts. He died on June 10, 1964, at his home in Haverhill.

Head coaching record

Football

References

External links
 

1879 births
1964 deaths
19th-century players of American football
American football fullbacks
American football tackles
Richmond Spiders baseball coaches
Richmond Spiders football coaches
Richmond Spiders track and field coaches
Bowdoin Polar Bears football players
Sportspeople from Beverly, Massachusetts
People from Brunswick, Maine
People from Georgetown, Massachusetts
Sportspeople from Haverhill, Massachusetts
Coaches of American football from Maine
Players of American football from Maine